DJ Food is an electronic music project currently headed by Kevin Foakes (also known as "Strictly Kev"). Originally conceived by the members of Coldcut on the Ninja Tune independent record label, the project started in 1990 on the premise of providing metaphorical "food for DJs". DJ Food released the Jazz Brakes series, with Jazz Brakes Volume 3 being the most successful. The records consisted of collections of breaks, loops and samples that could be used for mixing, remixing and producing.

The later DJ Food albums have developed with shades of Latin, dub, breakbeat, ambient, and drum and bass.

The 1995 album A Recipe for Disaster was a conscious move away from the Jazz Brakes volumes to form more of an identity as an artist, and a remix album of tracks from all six LPs, entitled Refried Food was released the following year. The more recent release, Kaleidoscope (2000), featured guest artists including Bundy K. Brown (formerly of Tortoise, Directions in Music, Pullman) and voiceover artist and jazz poet, Ken Nordine.

Members
DJ Food started as a Coldcut side project from Jonathan More and Matt Black. Along the way they met Patrick Carpenter, who was listed on the liner notes, but only his initials. A loose collaborative team began to form including Paul Brook, Paul Rabiger, Kevin Foakes a.k.a. Strictly Kev and Issac Elliston.

Although keeping their hand in as DJs on the albums, Black and More could not perform DJ sets twice in one night under the aliases of both Coldcut and DJ Food, so they handed the mantle of live performances over to PC and Strictly Kev. Later, PC became so involved with The Cinematic Orchestra that he decided to quit DJ Food, leaving Strictly Kev as the sole director of the project. He has since contributed three remixes to The Shape of Things That Hum EP in 2009.

Discography

Albums
Jazz Brakes Vol. 1 (October 1990)
Jazz Brakes Vol. 2 (September 1991)
Jazz Brakes Vol. 3 (July 1992)
Jazz Brakes Vol. 4 (June 1993)
Jazz Brakes Vol. 5 (October 1994)
A Recipe for Disaster (October 1995)
Refried Food (remix album) (January 1996, re-released with additional remixes)
Kaleidoscope (April 2000)
The Search Engine (January 2011)
The Good Food Guide (compilation) (January 2012)

DJ mix albums
Blech II: Blechsdöttir (1996, Warp)
Mixed by PC and Strictly Kev (as Strictly).
"Sonic Soup" on MLO: Plastic Apple (Oct 1996, Aura Surround Sounds)
56 minute mix by DJ Food as Disc 1 of the 3 CD set.
Coldcut & DJ Food vs DJ Krush: Cold Krush Cuts (Feb 1997, Ninja Tune)
Solid Steel Presents DJ Food & DK: Now, Listen! (Oct 2001, Ninja Tune)
Mix album for Ninja Tune's Solid Steel mix series, with producer DK.
Solid Steel Presents DJ Food & DK: Now, Listen Again! (Mar 2007, Ninja Tune)
You Don't Know Ninja Cuts - DJ Food's 1000 Mask Mix (2008, Ninja Tune)
Ninja Tune compilation mixed by Strictly Kev.

Internet only releases
Raiding the 20th Century - Words & Music Expansion  (2004, digital self-release on UbuWeb and Ninja Tune limited edition)
A history of cut-up music with Paul Morley as narrator, originally aired in January 2004 on XFM's The Remix.
More Volts: The Funky Eno (2010, digital self-release on SoundCloud)
A mix of Brian Eno tracks.

References

Reviews
ContemporaryTalks.com - 'Cosmic Travels at Pure Evil Gallery'

Interviews
ContemporaryTalks.com - In-depth Interview with DJ Food
Radio Feature, The Some Assembly Required Interview with DJ Food's Strictly Kev

External links

DJ Food at Ninja Tune website

Cosmic Travels at Pure Evil Gallery – review of exhibition on ContemporaryTalks.com
Kaleidoscope review on Pitchfork Media

English dance music groups
English DJs
English electronic music groups
Musicians from London
Ninja Tune artists